Elizabeth Stokoe is a British scientist and Professor of Social Interaction at Loughborough University where she studies conversation analysis.

Education 

She graduated from the University of Central Lancashire (Preston Poly) in 1993 with a traditional psychology degree.  
Then Stokoe completed three years PhD research at Nene College (Leicester University) under the supervision of Dr. Eunice Fisher. She studied video recordings of university tutorials, and conducted conversation analyses of the way students produced topical talk, topic management, academic identity, and the relevance of gender.

Career 
Stokoe joined the Department of Social Sciences at Loughborough in October 2002 and was promoted to Reader in 2007 and Chair in 2009. She teaches on the BSc Social Psychology programme, covering modules in relationships, qualitative methods and forensic psychology.

Stokoe has studied interaction in settings including police interviews with subjects and speed-dating. Her current research includes hostage negotiation, commercial sales calls, and appointment making calls to general practice surgeries.
 
Stokoe developed the Conversation Analytic Role-play Method (CARM), an approach to communications skills training based on evidence about what sorts of problems and roadblocks can occur in conversation, as well as the techniques and strategies that best resolve these problems. CARM can be adapted to any sort of workplace or institutional encounter. In contrast to traditional role-play, CARM uses audio and video recordings of real-time, actual encounters to identify conversational problems and roadblocks as well as effective practices for avoiding and resolving them. CARM won a WIRED Innovation Fellowship 2015.

She co-edited the journal Gender and Language from 2011 to 2014 and was associate editor of the British Journal of Social Psychology from 2009 to 2014. She was a guest editor on a special issue of Discourse Studies on the topic of membership categorization analysis and social interaction. 
She launched the journal Mediation Theory and Practice and is on the board of the College of Mediators.

Stokoe spoke about CARM at TEDxBermuda in October 2014, The Royal Institution in 2015, and the New Scientist Live in 2016.

Selected bibliography 
Stokoe's academic publications include:

Books

Chapters in books

Journal articles

References

External links 
 

Academics of Loughborough University
Academics of the University of Derby
Alumni of the University of Leicester
British mass media scholars
Living people
Year of birth missing (living people)
Place of birth missing (living people)